Glen Eldon Nelson (January 28, 1927 - March 16, 2012) was an American jockey in the sport of Thoroughbred horse racing who competed primarily at tracks on the East Coast of the United States and who is best known for winning the 1972 Preakness Stakes.

In 1948, Eldon Nelson married Betty Rose Coffman (1930–2005) with whom he had two children.

During a career that spanned four decades, Nelson rode for some of the leading stables in the country including Henry and Jane Lunger's Christiana Stables, Isabel Dodge Sloane's Brookmeade Stable, as well as the renowned Calumet Farm. On February 28, 1949, at Hialeah Park Race Track in Hialeah, Florida, he rode Calumet's future U.S. Racing Hall of Fame colt Coaltown to a win that equalled the world record of 1:47 3/5 for a mile-and-an-eighth on dirt.

American Classic Races
Eldon Nelson had two mounts in the Belmont Stakes with his best result in 1957 when he rode Inside Tract to a second-place finish behind Gallant Man. On May 29, 1972, the forty-four-year-old Nelson earned the most important win of his career. In his fourth mount in the Preakness Stakes, the second leg of the U.S. Triple Crown series, on a sloppy Pimlico Race Course he rode the William S. Farish III colt Bee Bee Bee to victory.

Eldon Nelson retired in 1973. He and his wife returned to live on their farm near Cedar Vale, Kansas.

In 2009, Nelson was inducted into the Oklahoma Horse Racing Hall of Fame.

References

1927 births
2012 deaths
American jockeys
People from Noble County, Oklahoma
People from Chautauqua County, Kansas